Shane O'Connor (born 29 March 1983) is a former rugby union player from Ireland. Originally playing for Cork Constitution, he was a member of the Ireland under-21 team that reached the Under 21 Rugby World Championship final in 2004. He joined the Munster squad in 2006 as a second-row (lock), before moving to Harlequins in the Guinness Premiership in England during 2008. Released by Harlequins in 2009, he played several seasons in the National Rugby League and Fédérale 1 League in France.

References

Living people
1983 births
Irish rugby union players
Harlequin F.C. players
Munster Rugby players